Vimolj pri Predgradu is a small settlement in the Municipality of Kočevje in southern Slovenia. The area is part of the traditional region of Lower Carniola and is now included in the Southeast Slovenia Statistical Region.

Name
The name of the settlement was changed from Vimolj to Vimolj pri Predgradu in 1953.

References

External links
Vimolj pri Predgradu on Geopedia

Populated places in the Municipality of Kočevje